Mayan Sign Language is a sign language used in Mexico and Guatemala by Mayan communities with unusually high numbers of deaf inhabitants. In some instances, both hearing and deaf members of a village may use the sign language. It is unrelated to the national sign languages of Mexico (Mexican Sign Language) and Guatemala (Guatemalan Sign Language), as well as to the local spoken Mayan languages and Spanish.

Yucatec Mayan Sign Language
Yucatec Maya Sign Language, is used in the Yucatán region by both hearing and deaf rural Maya. It is a natural, complex language which is not related to Mexican Sign Language, but may have similarities with sign languages found in nearby Guatemala.

As the hearing villagers are competent in the sign language, the deaf inhabitants seem to be well integrated into the community – in contrast to the marginalization of deaf people in the wider community, and also in contrast to Highland Mayan Sign Language. 

The oral language of the community is the Yucatec Maya language.

Highland Mayan Sign Language
In the highlands of Guatemala, Maya use a sign language that belongs to a "sign language complex" known locally in the Kʼicheʼ language as Meemul Chʼaabʼal and Meemul Tziij, "mute language." Researcher Erich Fox Tree reports that it is used by deaf rural Maya throughout the region, as well as some traders and traditional storytellers. These communities and Fox Tree believe that Meemul Chʼaabʼal belongs to an ancient family of Maya sign languages. Fox Tree claims that Yucatec Maya Sign Language is closely related and substantially mutually intelligible.

Footnotes

Further reading
Johnson, Robert E. (1991). Sign language, culture & community in a traditional Yucatec Maya village, in  Sign Language Studies 73:461-474 (1991).
Shuman, Malcolm K. & Mary Margaret Cherry-Shuman. (1981). A brief annotated sign list of Yucatec Maya sign language. Language Sciences, 3, 1 (53), 124–185.
Shuman, Malcolm K. (1980). The sound of silence in Nohya: a preliminary account of sign language use by the deaf in a Maya community in Yucatán, Mexico. Language Sciences, 2, 1 (51), Mar, 144–173.
Du Bois, John W. (1978). Mayan sign language: An ethnography of non-verbal communication. Paper presented at the 77th annual meeting, American Anthropological Association, Los Angeles.
 Smith, Hubert L. (1982) "The Living Maya," a 4-hour film documentary on the Yucatecan community with scenes of the deaf and their uses of sign.
 Smith, Hubert L. (1977–2006) A corpus of film and video expressly devoted to the Maya deaf and archived at The Smithsonian Institution.
Fox Tree, Erich. (2009). Meemul Tziij:An Indigenous Sign Language Complex of Mesoamerica, Sign Language Studies,  9(3):324–366 (Spring 2009). Abstract
Le Guen, Olivier. (2012). An exploration in the domain of time: from Yucatec Maya time gestures to Yucatec Maya Sign Language time signs. In U. Zeshan & C. de Vos (Eds.), "Endangered Sign Languages in Village Communities: Anthropological and Linguisitic Insights" (pp. 209–250). Berlin: Mouton de Gruyter & Ishara Press.

External links
SIL overview of YMSL
Yucatec Maya Sign Language Documentation Project

Village sign languages
Mayan languages
Mesoamerican languages
Sign languages of Mexico
Sign languages of Guatemala